The Chambre de la sécurité financière (English: Chamber of Financial Security) is the self-regulatory organization for representatives subject to Autorité des marchés financiers (Québec) distributing financial products and services, and Financial Planners of Quebec (Canada).

The reason of being of CSF is to ensure the integrity and professionalism of its members by maintaining discipline and by ensuring the training and supervision of its members.

The CSF supervises about 32,000 members who have ethical obligations. Those subjects to the CSF must take care of the interests of their clients and establish a relationship of trust with them in their consulting services. In their approach, they must know their client well and make the right diagnosis on their financial health. They must identify the specific needs of their clients, address their concerns and issues; in addition, they help them make good decisions in the choice of financial products and services and in their implementation.

Services to the Public 

The "Info-Déonto" application on the CSF website informs the public about the ethical standards and obligations that financial products professionals must comply with. The Public Protection section of the site is also specifically designed to guide the consumer in establishing a healthy relationship with a member of the CSF.

Operation 
From its founding until 2014, the CSF consisted of 20 regional sections. Each period of mandatory continuing education is two years starting on the first day of December.

The Act respecting the distribution of financial products and services (ADFPS) provides that the board of directors of the CSF is made up of 11 directors, nine of whom are elective. Of these nine positions, six are elected on a regional basis: three for the insurance of persons discipline and three for the group savings plan brokerage discipline. Representatives of investment contract and scholarship plans, group insurance of persons and financial planning are elected by all the representatives of these disciplines, on a voluntary basis. provincial. Finally, two (2) directors are appointed by the Minister of Finance to represent the public and complete the total of 11 directors.

History

CSF outstanding Awards

Note: The 2016 Future Prize (French: Prix Avenir) was awarded to Marie-Philip Babineau and Racky Fayol N'Diaye; and in 2017 to Mak Vaillancourt. This distinguished awards program was discontinued after that of 2017.

"Association des intermédiaires en assurance de personnes du Québec" (AIAPQ)

Winner of the outstanding awards given by the AIAPQ Trophé Victor Dumais 
In 1996 Kamal G. Lutfi  A.V.C. Pl.Fin. President of Laval Chapter (third largest Chapter), President of the Board of all Presidents 20 Chapters in Quebec, Provincial Administrator in 1997

The Trophé Victor Dumais is the highest Award for Excellency and Accomplishment in the Life Insurance Industry. It is measured by the efficiency and participation of its members plus Education seminars and fund raising activities.

Members 
Its members are:
 Financial security advisors(i.e. representatives in insurance of persons);
 Group insurance representatives;
 Representative of mutual fund dealer;
 Representatives of Scholarship plan broker, and;
 Financial planners who are not regulated by an authorized Professional Order.

For example, the "Chambre de la sécurité financière" (Chamber of Financial Security) brings together all professionals in the Quebec financial sector (except: securities representatives) with its counterpart, the Chambre de l'assurance de dommages (Québec) (Chamber of Damage Insurance), whose members are "damage insurance agents", "damage insurance brokers" and claims adjusters.

Compulsory continuing education 

The CSF supervises the compulsory continuous training of its subjects in the disciplines it supervises, in particular by:
 The administration of its register of continuing education units (UFC);
 Accreditation of continuing education activities offered to training providers;
 Its offer a large range of training activities in meeting room or through Internet.

Historically, the CSF has been innovative in terms of training its members. It also provides in-company training on request. Training focuses on compliance and on the various disciplines under supervision. Internet training activities have become very popular.

Disciplinary Committee 

The "Discipline Committee" shall hear any complaint made by the trustee against a representative. Complaints may come from a consumer or from any representative of the CSF. For example, a consumer who feels aggrieved or a representative of unethical practices may apply directly to the CSF or to the Information Center of the Autorité des marchés financiers.

References

External links
 Official website of "Chambre de la sécurité financière"
 Official website of "Autorité des marches financiers"
 Official website of "Ordre des administrateurs agréés du Québec" (Adm.A.)
 Official website of "Ordre des comptables agréés du Québec"

See also
 Autorité des marchés financiers (Québec) (AMF)
 Chambre de l'assurance de dommages (Québec) (CAD)
 Institut québécois de planification financière (IQPF)

Establishments in Quebec
Quebec
Quebec
Economy of Quebec
Quasi-judicial bodies
Organizations based in Montreal